The Remote Anti-Armor Mine System (RAAMS) are two types of 155mm howitzer projectiles containing nine anti-tank mines each: the M718 or M718A1 (RAAM-L) with a self-destruct time over 24 hours and the M741 or M741A1 (RAAM-S) with a self-destruct time under 24 hours. Both projectiles are used with the M577 or M577A1 Mechanical Time and Superquick (MTSQ) fuze, which triggers the ejection mechanism of the mines above enemy territory after a preset time.

Development of RAAMS dates to around 1980.

By January 2023, the US had sent approximately 10,200 rounds to Ukraine since the start of the Russian invasion of Ukraine in February 2022.

See also
 Area denial artillery munition (ADAM), the anti-personnel equivalent of the RAAMS
 Family of Scatterable Mines (FASCAM)

References

External links
 

Land mines of the United States
Artillery ammunition
Military equipment introduced in the 1990s